Gunaah means sin or fault in Hindi. It may refer to:
Gunaah (1993 film)
Gunaah (2002 film), a 2002 Bollywood thriller written by Mahesh Bhatt, directed by Amol Shetge and starring Bipasha Basu and Dino Morea in the lead roles. The film was released on 16 October 2002